Ana Paula Araújo may refer to:

 Ana Paula Araújo (model) (born 1981), Brazilian model
 Ana Paula Araújo (newscaster) (born 1972), Brazilian newscaster and journalist